Prodoxus coloradensis is a moth of the family Prodoxidae. In North America it is found from the Colorado Plateau in the north to northern Sonora in the south, east to the Big Bend region of Texas and west to the coastal range of southern California.

The wingspan is 8.9–12 mm for males and 9.2–13 mm for females. The forewings are mostly dark brown with white bands and patches. The hindwings range from light to medium gray. Adults are on wing from April to June.

The larvae feed on Yucca baccata, Yucca arizonica and Yucca schidigera. They feed in a gallery inside the flowering stalk of their host plant. It has been recorded to emerge after at least five years in diapause.

References

Moths described in 1892
Prodoxidae